Leucotmemis kaietura is a moth of the subfamily Arctiinae. It was described by Schaus in 1940. It is found in Guyana.

References

 Natural History Museum Lepidoptera generic names catalog

Leucotmemis
Moths described in 1940